Purslane is a common name for several mostly unrelated plants with edible leaves and may refer to:

 Portulacaceae, a family of succulent flowering plants, and especially:
 Portulaca oleracea, a species of Portulaca eaten as a leaf vegetable, known as summer purslane
 Portulaca grandiflora, moss rose, or moss-rose purslane
 Claytonia perfoliata, miner's lettuce or winter purslane
 Claytonia sibirica, pink purslane
 Halimione portulacoides, sea purslane
 Sesuvium portulacastrum, shoreline purslane
 Honckenya peploides, also called sea purslane
 Portulacaria afra, purslane tree